Gerd or GERD may refer to:

 Gerd (given name), a list of people with the given name or nickname
 Gerd (moon), a moon of Saturn
 Gerd Island, South Orkney Islands, Antarctica
 Gastroesophageal reflux disease, a chronic symptom of mucosal damage caused by stomach acid coming up from the stomach into the esophagus
 Grand Ethiopian Renaissance Dam, Benishangul-Gumuz Region, Ethiopia

Fictional and mythological figures
 Gerðr, sometimes modernly anglicized as Gerd or Gerth, the wife of the Norse god Freyr
 Gerd Frentzen, in the Japanese anime Blassreiter

See also
 Gird (disambiguation)
 Gurd (disambiguation)